Italy has competed at the European Games since the inaugural 2015 Games.

Medal tables

Medals by Games

Medals by sport

See also
 Italy at the Olympics

References